Leandro N. Alem is a city in the , and the head town of the department of the same name. At the  it had a population of 25,404 inhabitants.

The city is named after Leandro Alem (1844–1896), one of the founders of the Radical Civic Union.

References
 
 Municipality of Leandro N. Alem - Official website.

Populated places in Misiones Province